Darlington station is a defunct commuter rail station on the SEPTA Regional Rail R3 West Chester Line, located at 612 Darlington Road in Chester Heights, Pennsylvania. Originally built by the West Chester and Philadelphia Railroad, it later served the Pennsylvania Railroad's West Chester Branch, which finally became SEPTA's R3 line. 

The station, and all of those west of Elwyn station, was closed in September 1986, due to deteriorating track conditions and Chester County's desire to expand facilities at Exton station on SEPTA's Paoli/Thorndale Line. Service was "temporarily suspended" at that time, with substitute bus service provided. Darlington station still appears in publicly posted tariffs. Darlington station was named after the dairy located at that place. For years it was a flag stop, but was abandoned and then re-established.  However, Darlington Station was demolished shortly after service ended. The concrete curb for the platform edge and the access road are all that remain.

Darling, Pennsylvania
A post office was established at the station in 1879, which led to the place name Darling being officially recognized.  The GNIS classifies it as a populated place with "Darlington" recognized as a variant. The post office remained in operation until 1964. "Darling" was used to prevent confusion with the town of Darlington located in Beaver County, Pennsylvania.

References

External links

Existing Railroad Stations in Delaware County, Pennsylvania

Railway stations closed in 1981
Former SEPTA Regional Rail stations
Stations on the West Chester Line
Demolished railway stations in the United States
Former railway stations in Delaware County, Pennsylvania